The 2016–17 Loyola Greyhounds men's basketball team represented Loyola University Maryland during the 2016–17 NCAA Division I men's basketball season. The Greyhounds, led by fourth-year head coach G. G. Smith, played their home games at Reitz Arena in Baltimore, Maryland as members of the Patriot League. They finished the season 16–17, 8–10 in Patriot League play to finish in a tie for sixth place with Colgate. As the No. 7 seed in the  Patriot League tournament, they defeated Lafayette in the first round  before losing in the quarterfinals to Boston University. They received an invitation to the College Basketball Invitational where they defeated George Mason in the first round before losing in the quarterfinals to Coastal Carolina.

Previous season
The Greyhounds finished the 2015–16 season 9–21, 8–10 in Patriot League play to finish in eighth place. They lost in the first round of the Patriot League tournament to Holy Cross.

Offseason

Departures

2016 recruiting class

Roster

Schedule and results

|-
!colspan=9 style=| Exhibition

|-
!colspan=9 style=| Non-conference regular season

|-
!colspan=9 style=| Patriot League regular season

|-
!colspan=9 style=| Patriot League tournament

|-
!colspan=9 style=| CBI

References

Loyola Greyhounds men's basketball seasons
Loyola
Loyola